Suqualena Creek is a stream in the U.S. state of Mississippi.

Suqualena is a name derived from the Choctaw language purported to mean (sources vary) "creek on whose banks are camps" or "poor hog". A variant name is "Sookalena Creek".

References

Rivers of Mississippi
Rivers of Lauderdale County, Mississippi
Mississippi placenames of Native American origin